Mun Yong-gwan (born 5 July 1961) is a South Korean volleyball player. He competed in the men's tournament at the 1984 Summer Olympics.

References

1961 births
Living people
South Korean men's volleyball players
Olympic volleyball players of South Korea
Volleyball players at the 1984 Summer Olympics
Place of birth missing (living people)
Asian Games medalists in volleyball
Volleyball players at the 1978 Asian Games
Volleyball players at the 1982 Asian Games
Volleyball players at the 1986 Asian Games
Asian Games gold medalists for South Korea
Asian Games silver medalists for South Korea
Asian Games bronze medalists for South Korea
Medalists at the 1978 Asian Games
Medalists at the 1982 Asian Games
Medalists at the 1986 Asian Games
20th-century South Korean people